The Lauterbrunnen–Mürren Mountain Railway (BLM, also known as Mürrenbahn) is a hybrid transport system in the Bernese Oberland area of Switzerland, which connects the villages of Lauterbrunnen and Mürren. The system consists of a connected aerial cableway, also known as the Grütschalpbahn, and an adhesion worked mountain railway. The cableway replaced a funicular, on the same route, in 2010.

The line provides a vital passenger and goods link to the resort village of Mürren, which is situated above the cliffs of the Lauterbrunnen Valley and has poor road access. It also commands a view of the Eiger, Mönch and Jungfrau mountains across the depths of that valley.

The line is owned by the Bergbahn Lauterbrunnen-Mürren AG, a subsidiary of the Jungfraubahn Holding AG, a holding company that also owns the Wengernalpbahn, Jungfraubahn, Harderbahn, and Firstbahn. Through that holding company it is part of the Allianz - Jungfrau Top of Europe marketing alliance, which also includes the separately owned Berner Oberland-Bahn and Schynige Platte-Bahn.

History

The key milestones in the history of the line are:

1887 Concession obtained for the construction of the railways.
1889 The company is formed and construction starts.
1891 Railway opens. The planned opening on 1 June is delayed until 14 August due to a derailment.
1902 The funicular railway is converted from water gravity power to electric power .
1910 First winter operations started.
1912 Replacement of the locomotives on the Mürren to Grütschalp section by motor coaches (type BDe 2/4).
1949 New vehicles and rope are installed on the Lauterbrunnen to Grütschalp section.
1965 The new station at Mürren is opened.
1994 The freight loading operations at Grütschalp are rebuilt.
2006 Last operation of the funicular from Lauterbrunnen to Grütschalp was on 23 April and the first operation of the replacement cable car was on 16 December.

Operation

Route

The BLM commences from Lauterbrunnen, using a terminus that is directly opposite the platforms of the Berner Oberland-Bahn (BOB) to Interlaken, and the Wengernalpbahn (WAB) to Kleine Scheidegg and Grindelwald. The cableway follows the line of the funicular that preceded it, and the remains of the funicular are visible at many points.

The aerial cableway and railway connect at Grütschalp station, where both lines are within a single building, which also contains the line's workshop. A complex transfer machine in the station is used to transfer goods between the two sections and is well used since road access to Mürren is virtually impossible. The same machine was used to transfer goods between the funicular and rail, and has been retained for use with the cable car.

Through most of its length, the rail line commands a view of the Eiger, Mönch and Jungfrau across the depths of the Lauterbrunnen Valley. The railway has a single intermediate calling point, at Winteregg station, and runs to a terminus at Mürren station, where the platforms used by passengers are enclosed within a modern station building. Just before the station is reached, the line passes a large freight depot, used in the carriage of freight to Mürren.

Cable car

The cable car section of the line is operated by a single cable car, which shuttles between Lauterbrunnen and Grütschalp with a journey time of 4 minutes. The car has an upper passenger level, carrying up to 100 passengers, and a lower level capable of carrying 6 tonnes of freight. The cable car is scheduled with the railway to provide a through journey frequency of between two and four services per hour.

Rail infrastructure

The rail line is single-track, with a passing loop at Winteregg station. The line is operated using rail adhesion only, and has a maximum gradient of 5%. The former funicular shared the same track gauge, enabling the use of the funicular to transfer rolling stock to and from the electric railway.

The rail section is operated by single electric railcars, often towing or pushing a flat car for goods, with a journey time of 14 minutes. The railway is scheduled with the cable car to provide a through journey frequency of between two and four services per hour.

Rail vehicles
The rail line uses the following self-propelled vehicles:

In addition there are four low-floor flat cars, which are pushed or pulled by the passenger cars and carry demountable bodies that can be transferred to the cable car, and a number of unpowered works vehicles.

Future developments
In order to meet legislative requirement for disabled access, it is planned to replace the current fleet with modern low-floor vehicles. In September 2019 it was announced that Jungfraubahn Holding AG had awarded Stadler Rail at Bussnang a contract to supply three trainsets for at a cost of 17.3m Swiss francs. In addition, Mürren railway station, other stations and the Grütschalp workshop will be modernised.

See also 
 List of funicular railways
 List of funiculars in Switzerland

References

External links

Page on the BLM from the Jungfraubahn web site
Bergbahn Lauterbrunnen-Mürren in English. Part of a site about the Swiss narrow gauge railways.
Video of the cable car ride from Lauterbrunnen to Grütschalp
Video of the transfer machinery at Grütschalp in operation
Video footage of Winteregg Station

Mountain railways
Metre gauge railways in Switzerland
Railway lines in Switzerland
BLM
Funicular railways in Switzerland
Bernese Oberland
Former water-powered funicular railways converted to electricity
Transport in the canton of Bern
Railway lines opened in 1891
Railway companies established in 1891
Swiss companies established in 1891